The Isaac Brunner Property is a home in Savannah, Georgia, United States. It is located at 203 West Jones Street and was constructed in 1852. Brunner, a city alderman, also owned the adjacent property, at 205 West Jones Street, constructed a year earlier.

The building is part of the Savannah Historic District. 
In a survey for the Historic Savannah Foundation, Mary Lane Morrison found the building to be of significant status.

See also
Buildings in Savannah Historic District

References

Houses in Savannah, Georgia
Houses completed in 1852
Savannah Historic District